QUALIS may refer to:

 Qualis (CAPES), a Brazilian system for qualifying academic journals
 Toyota Qualis, a Toyota car
 Toyota Mark II Qualis, a mid-size car sold by Toyota
 Talis Qualis, pen name of Swedish author C. V. A. Strandberg (181–1877)

See also
 QualiSystems, a Cloud management software company
 Qualys, a cloud security provider